Williamson County is the name of three counties in the United States:

 Williamson County, Illinois
 Williamson County, Tennessee
 Williamson County, Texas

See also
 Williamson County Courthouse (disambiguation)